Namit Shah (born 21 October 2001) is an Indian child actor who works in Hindi-language films and television series. He is known for his role as Kabir in The Suite Life of Karan & Kabir and Vivaan Dwivedi in sitcom Wagle Ki Duniya - Nayi Peedhi Naye Kissey .

Career 
Shah started his career with an HSBC commercial in 2009, which was not aired in India. Since then, he starred in many television commercials. He was also featured in a Reebok advertisement alongside former India national cricket team captain, Mahendra Singh Dhoni. He has done various small roles for soap operas.

In 2012, Shah received the role of Kabir Jaiswal, in Disney India's popular television series, The Suite Life of Karan & Kabir. His character was a smart, quiet and mature boy of 10–11 years, though he indulged himself in mischievous acts with his twin brother, Karan (played by Siddharth Thakkar). He was cast in the role for two seasons of the show. In 2013, Shah made his silver screen debut with the film Main Krishna Hoon, alongside veteran actors like Juhi Chawla and Paresh Ganatra. He played Krishna, an orphaned boy who was assisted by Lord Krishna himself.
Currently he is playing the role of Vivaan in Wagle Ki Duniya - Nayi Peedhi Naye Kissey.

Filmography

Films

Television

See also
 List of Indian film actors

References

External links 
 
 

2001 births
Living people
Indian male film actors
Indian male television actors
Male actors in Hindi cinema
Male actors in Hindi television
Male actors from Bangalore
21st-century Indian male actors
21st-century Indian male child actors